The 57th New Brunswick Legislative Assembly was created following a general election in 2010.  Its members were sworn-in on October 12, 2010, it held its first meeting October 27, 2010, to elect a speaker, and it was officially opened on November 23, 2010, with a speech from the throne.  It was dissolved on Thursday, August 21, 2014, with an election called for September 22, 2014.

Leadership
Dale Graham was elected speaker on October 27, 2010.

David Alward was the Premier of New Brunswick.  The government house leader was Paul Robichaud.

The parliamentary opposition was provided by Liberals leader Brian Gallant. The opposition house leader was Bill Fraser.

Members
All of the current members were elected at the general election on September 27, 2010.

Standings changes in the 57 Assembly

See also
2006 New Brunswick general election
Legislative Assembly of New Brunswick

References

Terms of the New Brunswick Legislature
2010 establishments in New Brunswick
21st century in New Brunswick
2014 disestablishments in New Brunswick